Psychotria fusiformis is a species of plant in the family Rubiaceae. It is endemic to Ecuador. There are two known populations of the plant remaining, one east of Tena and the other south of Canelos.

References

fusiformis
Endemic flora of Ecuador
Vulnerable plants
Plants described in 1997
Taxonomy articles created by Polbot